Omari Bain (born 13 November 2002) is a Bahamian footballer who plays as a forward for FC Can Buxeres of the Spanish Tercera Catalana, and the Bahamas national team.

Career
In 2021, Bain joined Spanish side B1 Soccer Academy. Later that summer he moved to UCF Santa Perpètua. He made his debut for that club in the first match of the season, starting the match against UE Costa Brava on 28 August. By late 2022 Bain had moved to FC Can Buxeres of the Tercera Catalana.

International career
Bain made his senior international debut on 14 May 2022 in a friendly against Turks and Caicos.

International goals
Scores and results list Bahamas goal tally first.

International career statistics

References

External links
 
 
 Global Sports Archive profile
 La Preferente profile

Living people
2002 births
Bahamian footballers
Association football forwards
Bahamas international footballers
Bahamian expatriate footballers
Bahamian expatriate sportspeople in Spain
Expatriate footballers in Spain